The Jenin Sport Club  is a football club from the city of Jenin West Bank, founded in 1945. The team plays in the West Bank Premier League. 

Football clubs in the West Bank
Association football clubs established in 1945
1945 establishments in Mandatory Palestine